Beaver Technology Center is a public elementary school in Garland, Texas.

History
Beaver Technology Center, formerly Beaver Elementary, is named after Mrs. Edith Beaver.  Mrs. Beaver and her husband, James Beaver, farmed the land where the school stands.  Luke Abbett, the first principal of this school opened the doors to Edith Beaver Elementary in 1960 for 279 students and 12 teachers. The teachers did everything: library, music, art, core subjects, and lunch and recess duty for the 30 plus students in their classes. Within five years, Beaver's population swelled to 650 students, eventually maxing out with over 800 students.

Magnet Program
Beaver Technology Center is an elementary magnet school in the Garland Independent School District located in Garland, Texas. Beaver Elementary opened in 1960. In 1997 it reopened as a magnet school for students who have a special interest in math, science and technology, also known as MSTs. Beaver Technology Center is one of two MSTs in Garland, serving students in west Garland, north Garland and Sachse. Watson Technology Center, Beaver's sister school, serves east and south Garland, as well as the community of Rowlett.

In 2009, the school was rated "exemplary" by the Texas Education Agency.

Statistics (per 2010)
The attendance rate for students at the school is 95%, compared with a state average of 96%. 44% of the students at Beaver are economically disadvantaged, 9% enroll in special education, 4% enroll in gifted and talent programs.

The ethnic makeup of the school is 31.8% Hispanic, 25.7% African American, 29.3% White, non-Hispanic, 20.0% Asian/Pacific Islander, and less than 1% Native American.

The average class sizes at Beaver are 21 students per class (with the exception of kindergarten).

Teachers at the school carry, on average, 10 years of teaching experience and 7% of the teachers on staff are first-year teachers.

Feeder Patterns
Garland ISD is a Free Choice school district, which allows the parent to choose which school his or her children want to attend within the district.

See also
Garland Independent School District
Garland, Texas
Magnet School

References

External links
Beaver Technology Center

Educational institutions established in 1960
Public elementary schools in Texas
Magnet schools in Texas
Education in Garland, Texas
Schools in Dallas County, Texas
1960 establishments in Texas